Wadesboro Township, population 9,118, is one of eight townships in Anson County, North Carolina,  United States. Wadesboro Township contains the town of Wadesboro.

Geography
Wadesboro Township is drained by Brown Creek and its tributaries on the north and west.  These tributaries include Pinch Gut Creek, Goulds Fork, Hurricane Creek, and Flat Fork.  Goulds Fork has two tributaries, Culpepper Creek and Grindstone Branch.  The northeast part of the township is drained by Cedar Creek.  The southeast end is drained by Bailey Creek and its tributary Brush Fork and by North Fork Jones Creek and its tributary, Lampley Branch.

References

Townships in Anson County, North Carolina
Townships in North Carolina